Helmsdale railway station is a railway station serving the village of Helmsdale in the Highland council area, northern Scotland. It is located on the Far North Line, between Brora and Kildonan,  from Inverness. ScotRail, who manage the station, operate all services.

History

The station buildings were designed by the architect William Fowler.

The station master's house on the platform was abandoned in the 1980s. In 2013 it was refitted as self-catering holiday accommodation.

Accidents and incidents 
On 29 April 1891 there was a collision between a down mixed train from Inverness which ran into an engine which had arrived earlier. Major Marindin of the Board of Trade investigated and found that the driver Robert Lindsay deliberately ignored the signals as he would have had difficulty in restarting the train on the rising gradient of 1 in 59.

Facilities 
Both platforms have waiting areas and benches, whilst platform 2 also has a help point. Bike racks and a car park are adjacent to platform 2. There is step free access to platform 2 only; platform 1 can only be accessed via the footbridge.

Platform layout 
Platform 1 on the southbound line can accommodate trains having six coaches, whereas platform 2 on the northbound line can hold seven.

Passenger volume 

The statistics cover twelve month periods that start in April.

Services
Mondays to Saturdays, there are four train each way that call here - southbound to  &  and northbound to  via Thurso. Sundays see a single departure each way.

References

Helmsdale
Railway stations in Sutherland
Railway stations in Great Britain opened in 1874
Railway stations served by ScotRail
Former Highland Railway stations
Listed railway stations in Scotland
Category B listed buildings in Highland (council area)
William Fowler railway stations